Lucas Esteves Souza (born 24 June 2000) is a Brazilian footballer who plays as a left back for Fortaleza, on loan from Palmeiras.

Career statistics

Club

Notes

Honours
Palmeiras
Campeonato Paulista: 2020
Copa do Brasil: 2020
Copa Libertadores: 2020

References

External links

2000 births
Living people
Footballers from São Paulo
Brazilian footballers
Association football defenders
Sociedade Esportiva Palmeiras players
Fortaleza Esporte Clube players
Colorado Rapids players
Campeonato Brasileiro Série A players
Major League Soccer players
Brazilian expatriate footballers
Brazilian expatriate sportspeople in the United States
Expatriate soccer players in the United States